Sidney Weil (December 23, 1891 – January 14, 1966) was an American business executive and salesperson, who owned the Cincinnati Reds of the National League within Major League Baseball (MLB) for four seasons at the beginning of the 1930s.

Biography
Late in the 1929 season, Weil secretly acquired enough shares of the Cincinnati Reds to become the majority owner. His purchase, estimated at $635,000, occurred weeks prior to the Wall Street Crash of 1929. During the four full seasons (1930–1933) that he owned the team, the Reds finished in last place in the National League three times, while accruing a record of 235–379 for a .383 winning percentage. In November 1933, Weil's majority ownership of the Reds was taken over by the Central Trust Bank. Powel Crosley Jr. bought the team in February 1934.

Weil was an executive of an auto sales company before buying the Reds. He filed for bankruptcy shortly after selling the Reds, listing liabilities of over $950,000. He moved to insurance sales in 1937, and sold over $1 million of insurance for 23 years in a row. Weil died in January 1966, as the result of a traffic collision in Cincinnati. He was survived by his wife, two daughters, and a son. His wife, Florence, died in 1998 at the age of 104. His son, Irwin, became a professor of Russian literature at Northwestern University.

References

External links
Cincinnati Reds timeline

1891 births
1966 deaths
Major League Baseball executives
Cincinnati Reds owners
American salespeople
Road incident deaths in Ohio